Chintan Gaja (born 13 November 1994) is an Indian cricketer. He made his first-class debut for Gujarat in the 2016–17 Ranji Trophy on 27 October 2016. He made his List A debut for Gujarat in the 2016–17 Vijay Hazare Trophy on 1 March 2017. In November 2017, in his ninth first-class match, he took 8 wickets for 40 runs in the first innings for Gujarat against Rajasthan in the 2017–18 Ranji Trophy.

References

External links
 

1994 births
Living people
Indian cricketers
Gujarat cricketers
Cricketers from Ahmedabad